Ten ships of the Royal Navy have been named HMS Triumph. Another was planned, but renamed before being launched:
 English ship Triumph (1562) was a 68-gun galleon built in 1561. She was rebuilt in 1596, and sold in 1618.
  was a 44-gun ship launched in 1623 and broken up in 1687.
  was a 90-gun second-rate ship of the line launched in 1698. She was renamed HMS Prince in 1714, rebuilt in 1750 and broken up in 1773.
  was an 18-gun sloop, formerly the Spanish San Cristóbal (1735), (alias Triunfo). She was captured in 1739 and foundered in 1740.
  was a 74-gun third-rate ship of the line launched in 1764. She was used for harbour service from 1813 and was broken up in 1850.
 HMS Triumph was to have been a 91-gun screw propelled Bulwark-class second rate. She was renamed  before her launch in 1862 as a  armoured frigate. 
  was a Swiftsure-class battleship launched in 1870. She was renamed HMS Tenedos in 1904, being used as a depot ship, and then a training ship. She was renamed HMS Indus IV in 1912, and HMS Algiers in 1915. She was sold in 1921.
  was a Swiftsure-class battleship launched in 1903 and sunk by U-21 in 1915.
  was a T-class submarine launched in 1938 and sunk in 1942.
  was a Colossus-class light fleet aircraft carrier launched in 1944. She was converted to a heavy repair ship in 1964 and was scrapped in 1981.
  is a Trafalgar-class fleet submarine launched in 1990 and currently in service.

Battle honours

Armada, 1588
Dover, 1652
Kentish Knock, 1652
Portland, 1653
Gabbard, 1653
Scheveningen, 1653
Lowestoft, 1665
Four Days' Battle, 1666
Orfordness, 1666
Sole Bay, 1672
Schooneveld, 1673
Texel, 1673
Cornwallis's Retreat, 1795
Camperdown, 1797
Dardanelles, 1915
Malta Convoys, 1941
Mediterranean, 1941
Korea, 1950

See also
 
 
 

Royal Navy ship names

ja:トライアンフ